Bohdan Valeriyovich Polyakhov (born 4 June 1990) is a Ukrainian footballer playing with Ukraine AC in Arena Premier League.

Playing career 
Polyakhov began his career in 1999 in the Ukrainian Second League with FC Bastion Illichivsk. In 2011, he played in the Ukrainian First League with FC Zirka Kropyvnytskyi, and finished the season with FC Nyva-V Vinnytsia. After the relegation of Nyva in 2012 he signed with FC SKA Odesa, while the following season he returned to FC Bastion. In 2013, he returned to the Second League to play with FC Karlivka and FC Real Pharma Odesa.

In 2016, he went overseas to Canada to sign with Toronto Atomic FC of the Canadian Soccer League. In his debut season he appeared in eight matches recorded three goals, and clinched a post-season berth by finishing fifth in the standings. In 2017, he played indoor soccer with Ukraine AC in the Arena Premier League. For the 2018 summer season he played in League1 Ontario with Alliance United FC.

References

External links
 
 

1990 births
Living people
Footballers from Odesa
Ukrainian footballers
Association football forwards
FC Bastion Illichivsk players
FC Zirka Kropyvnytskyi players
FC Nyva Vinnytsia players
FC SKA Odesa players
FC Karlivka players
FC Real Pharma Odesa players
Toronto Atomic FC players
Alliance United FC players
Canadian Soccer League (1998–present) players
Ukrainian First League players
Ukrainian Second League players
Ukrainian Amateur Football Championship players
Ukrainian expatriate footballers
Expatriate soccer players in Canada
Ukrainian expatriate sportspeople in Canada